The seventh series of The Great British Bake Off aired from 24 August 2016, with twelve contestants competing to be crowned the series 7 winner.

This series was the last to be broadcast on BBC One, as the production company Love Productions opted to move the show to Channel 4. As such, it was also the last series to feature Sue Perkins, Mel Giedroyc, and Mary Berry. 

In the United States, the seventh series was broadcast as the fourth season on PBS and streamed as Collection 4 on Netflix.

Sue Perkins does not appear in episode 2. When the episode was being filmed in April 2016 she needed time off to deal with a bereavement. She does appear vocally in the narration.

Bakers

Results summary 

This series was won by Candice Brown, with Andrew Smyth and Jane Beedle finishing as runners-up.

Colour key:

Episodes

Episode 1: Cake 
For the first challenge, the bakers were given two hours to make a drizzle cake, the brief being that the cake be moist and well permeated with the drizzle. For the technical challenge, the bakers were instructed to make Mary's recipe for twelve jaffa cakes. The recipe used a whipped fatless sponge, orange jelly and tempered chocolate with a design of sorts. For the final challenge, the bakers were instructed to make a mirror glaze cake. The cake had to have a genoise sponge and have a very shiny, mirror-like top, covering the cake entirely.

Episode 2: Biscuits 
For the Signature Challenge, the bakers were given two and a half hours to make 24 iced biscuits (cookies). The biscuits had to be crisp and uniform. Viennese Whirls were set as the technical challenge. To be completed in an hour and a half, they had to be filled with buttercream and jam, and had have a defined shape. For the showstopper, a gingerbread scene was set as the challenge, the only brief being it that it had to be 30 cm high, and contain eight characters or objects. The bakers had four hours for this challenge.

Host Sue Perkins did not appear in the episode.

Episode 3: Bread 
For the bakers' first challenge, they had to make a chocolate loaf in two and a half hours. The loaf had to contain chocolate in some form, whether it be cocoa powder or actual pieces of chocolate. For the technical challenge, the bakers were required to make twelve Dampfnudel, a recipe Paul called "notoriously difficult". In two hours, the bakers had to make twelve steamed bread rolls with two types of sauce. A savoury plaited (braided) centrepiece was set as the showstopper, to be created using at least three different flours, in four hours.

Episode 4: Batter 
The first task was to make Yorkshire puddings, in 2 hours.  The bakers used the standard recipe filled with a variety of savory ingredients and flavors. The technical challenge gave the bakers 1 hour to make 12 heart-shaped "lace" pancakes, which required them to draw a heart-shaped design with the batter. They were only allowed one practice pancake.  The showstopper challenge was to make 36 sweet churros in 3 hours.

Episode 5: Pastry 
For the signature bake, bakers were tasked with baking 24 breakfast pastries. Two different batches of 12 pastries were to be made. The technical challenge required the bakers to make one feathered Bakewell tart. For the showstopper challenge, the bakers were challenged to make 48 filled filo amuse-bouche; 24 with a savoury filling and 24 with a sweet filling.

Episode 6: Botanical 
In the signature, the seven remaining bakers were asked to create a meringue pie containing citrus fruit, such as orange, grapefruits and lemons. In the technical, the contestants had to create two leaf-shaped herb fougasses. In the showstopper, the contestants were asked to create a three-tier cake with a flower theme. All the tiers could be the same flavour, or each one a different flavour, and the cakes could be decorated with flowers.

Episode 7: Desserts 
The Signature challenge required the bakers to make a family-sized roulade in  hours. The judges were looking for a light sponge cake, even layers of filling, and a clean swirl. The technical challenge gave the bakes 3 hours to make a Marjolaine or Dacquoise, an unusual layered cake made with meringue, decorated with ganache and nuts. The showstopper challenge allocated 4 hours for the bakers to make 24 mini mousse cakes in two flavours (12 of each).

Episode 8: Tudor 
Week eight featured the show's first Tudor theme, featuring food common in the 16th century. During the signature challenge, the five remaining bakers were asked to bake a shaped pie with Tudor flavours. The pie could be any type of pastry and they could use whichever fillings they wanted. In the technical, the contestants were asked to produce a dozen jumbles – six knot balls and six Celtic knots. In the showstopper challenge, the contestants were asked to bake a marchpane (marzipan) cake in a three-dimensional shape. However, all of the cakes had to be Tudor-themed.

Episode 9: Pâtisserie (Semi-final) 
The first task for pastry or pâtisserie week required the remaining four contestants to bake 24 palmiers, with two different savoury fillings and shapes. The technical challenge was to make a Savarin, a liqueur-soaked yeast cake, which none of the contestants had made before. The final challenge was to make 36 fondant fancies.

Episode 10: Royal Picnic (Final) 
In the final signature challenge, the bakers had to make a filled meringue crown, which had to contain at least three layers of meringue, in three hours. In the technical, the judges decided to make a familiar bake challenging: the bakers had to make a Victoria sandwich, with no recipe or method given, in 90 minutes. The final showstopper involved the largest number of bakes ever requested in a challenge. The bakers were given five hours to make a picnic fit for the Queen, including one chocolate celebration cake, 12 sausage rolls, 12 mini quiches, 12 savoury scones and 12 fruit and custard tarts.

Christmas specials 
The Masterclass episodes were replaced by two Christmas specials, which featured eight contestants from the series 2–5. The two Christmas specials were the last to be aired on BBC before the channel move, and thus featured the last appearances of hosts Mel Giedroyc and Sue Perkins and judge Mary Berry. Judge Paul Hollywood then followed the channel move.

The first Christmas special featured Mary-Anne Boermans (Series 2), Cathryn Dresser (Series 3), Ali Imdad (Series 4) and Norman Calder (Series 5). The competition was won by Mary-Anne Boermans.  The second Christmas special featured Janet Basu (Series 2), James Morton (Series 3), Howard Middleton (Series 4) and Chetna Makan (Series 5). The competition was won by Chetna Makan.

Episode 1 
The signature challenge required the bakers to create 2 batches of edible Christmas tree decorations, 12 of each type, using biscuits. The technical challenge, set by Mary, tasked the bakers to make a choux wreath consisting of 36 choux buns, filled and decorated festively with chocolate. For the showstopper challenge, the bakers were required to make a Christmas scene cake, with at least three tiers, in four hours

Episode 2 
The bakers were tasked to make 24 savoury Christmas canapés, 12 of two types in the signature challenge. The technical challenge was set by Paul, in which the bakers were tasked of baking a Kanellängd, a spiced Scandinavian celebratory Christmas loaf with the meaning of "cinnamon length". For the showstopper challenge, the bakers were required to make 36 sweet Christmas miniatures, 12 each of three types, arranged as a celebratory centerpiece.

Controversies 
Before the series had begun, some viewers complained of the "gendered" icing in preview pictures of the bakers. In the promo shots of the bakers, the male bakers were given blue icing while the female bakers were given pink icing, whereas the previous year, every baker was given the same colour regardless. As a result, the BBC altered the colouring of the icing.

Post-show career
Candice Brown was an occasional cook on ITV's This Morning. She appeared as a contestant on series 10 of Dancing on Ice in 2018. as well as on The Great New Year's Bake Off and Celebrity Mastermind which she won. She runs a pub, Green Man, in Eversholt, Bedfordshire. She has written a cookbook Comfort: delicious bakes and family treats released in 2017.

Andrew Smyth has appeared on Lorraine on ITV, Christmas Kitchen on BBC One. He baked a cake as a rotating jet engine for Prince William when he visited the Rolls-Royce factory in Derby where Smyth worked.

Ratings 
The opening episode had an average viewing figure of 10.4 million according to overnight ratings, an improvement over the figure of 9.3 million for the corresponding episode in 2015. This made it the most watched TV show of 2016 so far, with the official figure also making it the most watched TV show since the 2015 Bake Off Final.  Its run on the BBC ended with an average overnight viewing figure of 14 million for the final, peaking at 14.8 million, which is a record for the show.  The series dominated the list of most-watched programmes in 2016, with nine of the top ten being episodes of the show.  Its finale was watched by 15.9 million viewers (7 days cumulative figure), which makes it the most-watched TV shows in the UK in four years since the closing ceremony of the London Olympics in 2012, and the most-watched TV show of the year.

Official episode viewing figures are from BARB.

Specials

References

External links
 

Series 7
2016 British television seasons